Antonio Casale (17 May 1932 – 4 February 2017) was an Italian film actor of the 1960s and 1970s who appeared in mostly Spaghetti Western Italian films between 1965 and 1976.

Although his later roles were more prominent, Casale is probably most known worldwide for his brief appearance as the dying Bill Carson in Sergio Leone's Spaghetti Western The Good, the Bad and the Ugly in 1966, a film that has consistently been voted one of the greatest of all time.

Filmography

Maciste il vendicatore dei Maya (1965) - Berak
Sicario 77, vivo o morto (1966)
The Good, the Bad and the Ugly (1966) - Jackson / Bill Carson
Revenge for Revenge (1968)
Le salamandre (1969) - Dr. Henry Duval
Dal nostro inviato a Copenaghen (1970) - Borg
Quickly ...spari e baci a colazione (1971)
Riuscirà l'avvocato Franco Benenato a sconfiggere il suo acerrimo nemico il pretore Ciccio De Ingras? (1971)
The Case Is Closed, Forget It (1971)
Duck, You Sucker! (1971) - Notary on Stagecoach
What Have You Done to Solange? (1972) - Mr. Newton
The Grand Duel (1972) - Hole - Bounty Hunter 
Diario di una vergine romana (1973)
Milano trema: la polizia vuole giustizia (1973) - Casardi
Seven Hours of Violence (1973)
Anna, quel particolare piacere (1973) - Sogliani's henchman
Dagli archivi della polizia criminale (1973) - Il beduino
The Arena (1974) - Lucan
Una donna per 7 bastardi (1974) - Carl
Il tempo dell'inizio (1974) 
Autopsy (1975) - Inspector Silvestri
The Suspect (1975) - Resta
Silent Action (1975) - Giovanni Andreassi - aka Massù
Syndicate Sadists (1975) - Philip Duval
Lips of Lurid Blue (1975) - Bar Owner
Free Hand for a Tough Cop (1976) - El Greco Tomati
Mannaja (1977) - Dahlman 
Caligula (1979) - Roman (uncredited) (final film role)

References

External links

 

1936 births
2017 deaths
20th-century Italian male actors
Italian male film actors
Male Spaghetti Western actors